Sar Jub or Sar-i-Jub or Sarjoob or Sarjub may refer to:
 Sar Jub, Kermanshah
 Sar Jub-e Qaleh Masgareh, Kermanshah Province
 Sarjub, Sistan and Baluchestan
 Sar-i-Jub, South Khorasan